The Quad Cities MetroLINK, officially the Rock Island County Metropolitan Mass Transit District, provides mass transportation for the Illinois half of the Quad Cities metro area. Both Iowa cities that make up the region have their own systems, several MetroLINK routes connect with Davenport CitiBus, and Bettendorf Transit. It is the only transit system in the Quad Cities that operates seven days a week.  The system has a fleet of 68 fixed route buses that is composed of Twelve 35-foot compressed natural gas buses, Thirty Eight 40-foot compressed natural gas buses   As of 2022, they have seventeen all electric buses.  Its annual ridership is 3.5 million.

History

Quad Cities MetroLINK began service in 1970, as the Rock Island County Metropolitan Mass Transit District, to revive the local transit system, which had been privately operated. Throughout its early history, the agency was branded as RICMMTD, but in 1988, a public contest replaced this name with "MetroLINK" to improve name recogniction. 1998 saw the introduction of Channel Cat ferry service on the Mississippi River, while Compressed Natural Gas buses first appeared on the streets in 2002. In 2012, MetroLINK was named "Outstanding Public Transportation System of the Year" for systems carrying 1-4 million passengers annually by the American Public Transportation Association. In 2018, MetroLINK deployed its first three all-electric zero emission buses into service, with the electric bus fleet continuing to expand.

Route list
10-Red (Mon-Sat) - District Station to N. 20th St. & 2nd Ave. Hampton IL
20-Blue (Mon-Sat) - Centre Station to Quad City International Airport 
30-Green (Mon-Sat) - District Station to Colona IL via 18th Ave./19th Ave./Ave. of the Cities
40-Orange (Mon-Sat) - District Station to SW Rock Island Industrial Park and Bally's Casino
50-Olive (Mon-Sat) - East Pointe to Illini Tower/Silvis Hy-Vee
53-Lime (Mon-Sat) - District Station to Kohl's/Target/Hy-Vee Moline
53 - Late Night (Thu-Sat, 10:27 PM- 3:20 AM) - District Station to Augustana College
55-Sky Blue (Mon-Sat) - East Pointe to Silvis Wal-Mart
57-Brown (Mon-Sat) - Centre Station to Rock Valley Plaza to Valley View Drive Moline
59-Maroon (Mon-Sat) - Centre Station to Black Hawk College and Kennedy Square
60-Yellow (Mon-Sat) - District Station to Black Hawk College via 5th St./Blackhawk Rd./38th Ave.
70-Purple (Mon-Sat) - Centre Station to SW Rock Island Industrial Park
80-Pink (Mon-Fri, 5:45 AM-8:00 AM, 2:45 PM-4:30 PM) - Centre Station to Arsenal Clock Tower
Tyson Express Davenport, Iowa to Tyson in Joslin Illinois
WIU Connect Centre Station Moline to Western Illinois University Riverfront Campus to The Bend in East Moline.

Sunday Service
10-Red - District Station to East Pointe via Centre Station
20-Blue - :15 Centre Station South Park Mall Quad City International Airport 
20 Blue - :45 Centre Station South Park Mall Wal-Mart Moline
30-Green - District Station to Hy-Vee, Silvis
53-Lime - District Station to Augustana College Rock Island
40-Orange - District Station to W. 20th Ave., Milan
60-Yellow - Sunset Heights to Kennedy Square

Fleet

1081-1088		2010	NFI	C40LFR	Cummins Westport ISL G		
1201-1206		2012	NFI	XN40	Cummins Westport ISL G		
1401-1405		2014	NFI	XN40	Cummins Westport ISL G		
1601-1612		2016	NFI	XN40	Cummins Westport ISL G		
1801-1803		2018	Proterra	Catalyst BE40	
1804-1810		2018	NFI	XN35	Cummins Westport L9N		
1901-1905		2019	Proterra	Catalyst BE40	

2231-2235		2022	NFI	XN35	Cummins Westport L9N		
2241-2248		2022	NFI	XN40	Cummins Westport L9N		
2261-2269		2022	Proterra	ZX5 35'

Transfer Stations

Centre Station 
Centre Station is the signature hub of the Metro system, located at 1200 River Drive in Moline. It provides connections with nine routes. The facility was completed in April 1998 as a part of the John Deere Commons Development with a 12 bay, 12,000 square foot terminal. The showpiece for the Centre Station project is the corner clock tower that overlooks River Drive.  The stone and brick site is a 350-space parking facility that connects to the TaxSlayer Center via a glass and steel crosswalk. In addition to MetroLINK buses, the facility is also served by intercity buses from Greyhound Lines. In the future, the Centre Station is planned to become a passenger rail hub as part of the Quad Cities train project.

East Pointe Station
East Pointe Station is located at 1201 14th Avenue, in East Moline and connects three routes on the east end of the Metro system. The station, built in 2006, offers an indoor waiting area with restrooms and real-time signage, and is also equipped with a high tech community room that is available for local events.

District Station
District Station is Metro's newest station, opening in 2014, as part of a larger transit-oriented development at 1975 2nd Avenue in downtown Rock Island. The Station features ten bus docking stations with canopies, as well as an indoor lobby with restrooms, seating, real-time signage, and an informational kiosk. District Station is currently served by five Metro routes and offers a connection point with Davenport CitiBus Route 7.

Mega Stops

Quad City International Airport Mega Stop
Constructed in 2011, the QCIA Mega Stop is located directly outside the baggage terminal of the Airport. The Stop features a covered platform with benches, a kiosk with passenger information, lighting, and real-time LED signage. Metro's Route 20 serves the QCIA every half hour, and provides direct access to hotels and downtown Moline.

SouthPark Mall Mega Stop
SouthPark Mall is Metro's newest Mega Stop, completed in 2015. The stop, which provides direct connections with the South Mall Entrance, features a covered waiting area with platform, windbreaks with seating, real-time LED signage, lighting, and landscaping. The SouthPark Mall Mega Stop is served by Metro's Route 20 and Route 60.

Fixed Route Ridership

The ridership and service statistics shown here are of fixed route services only and do not include demand response.

See also
 List of bus transit systems in the United States

References

External links
Website at www.gogreenmetro.com

Government agencies established in 1970
Bus transportation in Illinois
Bus transportation in Iowa
Transportation in the Quad Cities
Rock Island, Illinois
Moline, Illinois